Joncet station (French: Gare de Joncet) is a French railway station located in the village of Joncet le Sola on the territory of the commune of Serdinya in the department of Pyrénées-Orientales. It is located at kilometric point (KP) 6.229 km on the Ligne de Cerdagne and is served by TER Occitanie operated by the SNCF, line 32 (Latour-de-Carol-Enveitg–Villefranche-Vernet-les-Bains, Train Jaune).

In 2018, the SNCF estimated that 29 passengers passed through the station.

History 
The station was opened on 18 July 1910 by the Chemins de fer du Midi, along with the first section of the Ligne de Cerdagne between Villefranche and Mont-Louis.

References

Railway stations in Pyrénées-Orientales
Railway stations in France opened in 1910